Lotfi Bin Ali was a Tunisian whom the United States held in extrajudicial detention for over thirteen years in the Guantanamo Bay detention camps, in Cuba.
He was one of five men transferred to Kazakhstan in 2014.
He was extensively quoted following the death by lack of medical care of one of the other captives transferred to Kazakhstan.
In a September 2016 profile in The Guardian, he described exile in Kazakhstan as being very isolating, and, in some ways, almost as bad as Guantanamo.

Health

Lotfi's health is poor.  A 2004 medical summary stated he had chronic heart disease that had required the placement of a mechanical heart valve; that he had kidney stones; latent tuberculosis, depression and high blood pressure. It stated he needed to have his blood tested, twice a month, to ensure he was receiving the right dose of anti-coagulants.

Vice magazine, who visited him in October 2015, ten and a half months after his transfer to Semey, Kazakhstan, said his local doctors didn't speak Arabic, and no translators were available.
  It reported that there were no cardiologists in Semey, and the security conditions agreed to by the USA and Kazakhstan, when he was transferred, did not permit him to leave Semey.

On both December 12 and 13 his weight was recorded as exactly . On December 16, his weight was recorded as exactly . By December 29, his records showed he had gained .

Lutfi bin Ali died on March 9, 2021 from heart disease complications and inability to afford required surgery.

Official status reviews

Originally, the Bush Presidency asserted that captives apprehended in the "war on terror" were not covered by the Geneva Conventions, and could be held indefinitely, without charge, and without an open and transparent review of the justifications for their detention.
In 2004, the United States Supreme Court ruled, in Rasul v. Bush, that Guantanamo captives were entitled to being informed of the allegations justifying their detention, and were entitled to try to refute them.

Office for the Administrative Review of Detained Enemy Combatants

Following the Supreme Court's ruling the Department of Defense set up the Office for the Administrative Review of Detained Enemy Combatants.

Scholars at the Brookings Institution, led by Benjamin Wittes, listed the captives still held in Guantanamo in December 2008, according to whether their detention was justified by certain common allegations:

 Lofti Bin Ali was listed as one of the captives whom the Wittes team were unable to identify as presently cleared for release or transfer.
 Lofti Bin Ali was listed as one of the captives who "The military alleges ... are associated with both Al Qaeda and the Taliban."
 Lofti Bin Ali was listed as one of the captives who "The military alleges that the following detainees stayed in Al Qaeda, Taliban or other guest- or safehouses."
 Lofti Bin Ali was listed as one of the captives who "The military alleges ... took military or terrorist training in Afghanistan."
 Lofti Bin Ali was listed as one of the captives who was a member of the "al Qaeda leadership cadre".
 Lofti Bin Ali was listed as one of "two alleged Al Qaeda leaders who have been cleared for release or transfer."

Formerly secret Joint Task Force Guantanamo assessment

On April 25, 2011, whistleblower organization WikiLeaks published formerly secret assessments drafted by Joint Task Force Guantanamo analysts.
His two-page Joint Task Force Guantanamo assessment was drafted on June 27, 2004.
It was signed by camp commandant Jay W. Hood.
He recommended release due to Lotfi's serious health problems, but noted the Criminal Investigative Task Force regarded him as a high risk.

Cleared for release by the Guantanamo Joint Task Force

President Barack Obama enacted three Executive Orders pertaining to Guantanamo on the day he took office.
Executive Order 13492 established a new review process for the remaining captive, one where those reviewing their status were senior officials representing several cabinet departments, including the Department of State, the Department of Homeland Security, the Department of Justice, and the Office of the Director of National Intelligence.  Lotfi was cleared, yet again, by his review.

Transfer to Kazakhstan 

On December 30, 2014, Lotfi and four other men were transferred to Kazakhstan, where they were kept under onerous security conditions.
Fox News said that al Lufti and the four other men were the first to be transferred to Kazakhstan.
Carol Rosenberg, of the Miami Herald, noted that al Lufti arrived in Guantanamo with serious heart disease, and his transfer had first been recommended in 2004, because his heart disease made him a low risk.
Three Yemenis, Asim Thabit Abdullah Al-Khalaqi, Muhammad Ali Husayn Khanayna and Sabri Mohammad al Qurashi and fellow Tunisians Adel Al-Hakeemy, were also transferred.  Reuters said that the 2009 reviews by the Joint Review Task Force had reclassified all five men as "low risk".

National Public Radio said that all the agencies with representatives on the Joint Review Task Force had unanimously agreed to release the five men.

Al Lufti and fellow Tunisian Al Hakeemy were relocated to Semey, while the Yemenis were relocated to Kyzylorda.

Vice News described the men transferred to Kazakhstan as only nominally being free.
Vice News interviewed al-Lutfi shortly after the May 7, 2015, death of his friend Asim Thabit Abdullah Al-Khalaqi, who was transferred to Kazakhstan at the same time he was.  Al-Lufti had been in regular contact with him via Skype, and had last spoken to him just three days before his death.  He told Vice News that Kazakhstan security officials regularly inspected the former captives' living quarters, initially doing so almost every day:

The police used to come almost every day to the apartment. They would open the door and enter and check the place for a minute or two, then they would leave... It's as if it's Guantanamo 2, to be honest.

Al Lufti contradicted Guantanamo spokesmen, who claimed al Khalaqi would not have been transferred if his health was compromised—saying that al-Khalaqi regularly fell into comas at Guantanamo, needing prompt medical care.
Al Lufti said al Khalaqi had been hospitalized multiple times, in Kazakhstan, prior to his death.

Vice News reported that "In cooperation with the Kazakh government, the local chapter of the ICRC is charged with the care of the former detainees, and provides healthcare, food stipends, language classes, and transport."

Kazakhstan security officials routinely enter the men's homes without a warrant.

Vice magazine profiled Lofti in October 2015.  It reported Kazakh authorities still hadn't issued him with identity documents, meaning he had to rely the Red Crescent Society to manage his affairs.

Vice was able to accompany Lofti to a meeting with Alfiya Meshina, the head of the Semey office of the Red Crescent Society.  She interrupted Lofti, when he was talking about his health, saying:

I don't want to listen to this bullshit about his health problems. Since he arrived here on the 31st of December last year and until today, all we have been doing is taking care of his health... We have so many poor and elderly people, so many large families that live much worse than he does. What is he, a national hero of Kazakhstan? Why should he enjoy special treatment and privileges?

UNESCO reported in 2019 that Lofti said he would prefer to live in actual detention in Guantanamo rather than in hostile Kazakhstan.

References

External links
 Who Are the Remaining Prisoners in Guantánamo? Part Seven: Captured in Pakistan (3 of 3) Andy Worthington, October 13, 2010

Detainees of the Guantanamo Bay detention camp
Tunisian extrajudicial prisoners of the United States
Living people
People from Tunis
1965 births
Year of birth uncertain